This list of museums in Tasmania, Australia, contains museums that are defined for this context as institutions (including nonprofit organizations, government entities and private businesses) that collect and care for objects of cultural, artistic, scientific or historical interest and make their collections or related exhibits available for public viewing. Also included are non-profit art galleries and university art galleries.

See also
 List of museums in Australia

References

 Discover Tasmania: Museums and Art Galleries

Tasmania

Museums
Museums